David Livermore is professor of medical microbiology at the University of East Anglia.

After working at the London Hospital Medical College from 1980 to 1997, he joined the Public Health Laboratory Service (later PHE), and became director of its Antibiotic Resistance Monitoring and Reference Laboratory. He was appointed professor of medical microbiology at the University of East Anglia in 2011. His chief research has been on the evolution and epidemiology of antibiotic resistance.

In 2020, Livermore  became a signatory to the Great Barrington Declaration.  he was a member of the Health Advisory and Recovery Team, a British pressure group opposed to COVID-19 mitigation measures and COVID-19 vaccines.

References 

 

British microbiologists
Academics of the University of East Anglia
Living people
Year of birth missing (living people)